Alexander Pavlovich Vinogradov (August 21, 1895 in Petretsovo, Yaroslavl Oblast – November 16, 1975 in Moscow) was a Soviet geochemist, academician (1953), and Hero of Socialist Labour (1949, 1975).

In 1928, he took up a position as assistant professor in the laboratory for biogeochemical problems of the Academy of Sciences of the Soviet Union.

He was director of Vernadsky Institute of Geochemistry and Analytical Chemistry, Academy of Sciences of the Soviet Union.

Mons Vinogradov, a mountain on the near side of the moon, is named after him. So is a large crater on Mars.

References

1895 births
1975 deaths
People from Yaroslavl Oblast
Foreign Fellows of the Indian National Science Academy
Foreign Members of the Bulgarian Academy of Sciences
Full Members of the USSR Academy of Sciences
Members of the Royal Swedish Academy of Sciences
S.M. Kirov Military Medical Academy alumni
Heroes of Socialist Labour
Stalin Prize winners
Lenin Prize winners
Recipients of the Lomonosov Gold Medal
Recipients of the Order of Lenin
Recipients of the Order of the Red Banner of Labour
Russian geochemists
Soviet geochemists

Burials at Novodevichy Cemetery